The Wufengqi Waterfall is a waterfall in Jiaoxi Township, Yilan County, Taiwan.

Geology
The waterfall consists of three levels, which are the upper part, middle part and lower part.

Transportation
The waterfall is accessible by bus from Jiaoxi Station of Taiwan Railways.

See also
 List of waterfalls

References

Landforms of Yilan County, Taiwan
Waterfalls of Taiwan